The Ackerville Baptist Church of Christ is a historic Baptist Church of Christ building in Ackerville, Alabama.  The one-story Greek Revival style church was built in 1848.  It was added to the Alabama Register of Landmarks and Heritage on July 22, 1991 and to the National Register of Historic Places on April 18, 2003 due to its architectural significance.

See also
List of Baptist churches in Alabama

References

National Register of Historic Places in Wilcox County, Alabama
Churches on the National Register of Historic Places in Alabama
Churches completed in 1848
19th-century Baptist churches in the United States
Greek Revival church buildings in Alabama
Baptist churches in Alabama
Properties on the Alabama Register of Landmarks and Heritage
Buildings and structures in Wilcox County, Alabama